The 1983 Coppa Italia Final was the final of the 1982–83 Coppa Italia. The match was played over two legs on 19 and 22 June 1983 between Juventus and Hellas Verona. Juventus won  after extra time 3–2 on aggregate.

First leg

Second leg

References
Coppa Italia 1982/83 statistics at rsssf.com
 https://www.calcio.com/calendario/ita-coppa-italia-1982-1983-finale/2/
 https://www.worldfootball.net/schedule/ita-coppa-italia-1982-1983-finale/2/

Coppa Italia Finals
Coppa Italia Final 1983
Hellas Verona F.C. matches